The Terrapin 24 is an American trailerable sailboat that was designed by Dave Westphal as a cruiser and first built in 1973.

Production
The design was built by the Friendship Manufacturing Company in the United States, from 1973 until 1980, with 60 boats completed, but it is now out of production.

Design
The Terrapin 24 is a recreational keelboat, built predominantly of fiberglass, with wood trim. It has a fractional sloop, a spooned raked stem, an angled transom, a transom-hung rudder controlled by a tiller and a steel lifting keel. It displaces  and carries  of ballast.

The boat is normally fitted with a small  outboard motor for docking and maneuvering.

The design has sleeping accommodation for five people, with a double "V"-berth in the bow cabin, a drop-down dinette table on the port side that forms a double berth and an aft quarter berth on the starboard side. The galley is located on the starboard side just aft of the bow cabin and is equipped with a two-burner stove and a sink. The enclosed head is located to the port side of the companionway ladder. The companionway uses two sliding hatches for additional light and ventilation.

Operational history
In a 2010 review Steve Henkel wrote, "the Florida designer of this ultra-shallow-draft boat had two things in mind: (1) easy trailering and launching from ramps, or even from beaches or low bulkheads, without immersing the trailer (says the sales literature, though how this can be accomplished, even using a fully-rollered trailer, with a boat weighing more than a ton, is not mentioned) and (2) cruising in relatively good comfort for this size vessel. To this end, the rig is on the short side (28' 6" bridge clearance, mast stepped on deck, for easy raising and striking), the draft is a mere nine inches, and the towing weight is only 3,000 pounds. Best features: ... The galley area, which runs along the starboard side amidships, is as spacious as one would want. Worst features: The boat apparently has no ballast other than the steel centerboard, which we assume weighs something like a hundred pounds. The flat bottom is likely to pound in a chop. The short, low-slung rig will be slower than average in light air."

See also
List of sailing boat types

References

External links
Photo of a Terrapin 24 hull on a trailer

Keelboats
1970s sailboat type designs
Sailing yachts 
Trailer sailers
Sailboat type designs by Dave Westphal
Sailboat types built by Friendship Manufacturing Company